St Catherine's Church, Scholefield Street, Nechells is a former Church of England parish church in Birmingham.

History

The foundation stone was laid on 27 July 1877 and the church was built to designs by Frank Barlow Osborn and Alfred Reading. It was consecrated on 9 November 1878 by the Bishop of Worcester.

A parish was assigned of St Clement's Church, Nechells in 1879.

The church was damaged in an air raid during the Second World War and closed formally in 1945. The parish was united with that of St Matthew's Church, Duddeston and Nechells and the church was subsequently demolished.

Organ

An organ by Henry Jones was installed in 1878. A specification of the organ can be found on the National Pipe Organ Register.

References

Church of England church buildings in Birmingham, West Midlands
Churches completed in 1878
Catherine